Luminor Bank AS is a bank headquartered in Tallinn, Estonia, with branches in Latvia and Lithuania. It is the third-largest bank in the Baltics and in Estonia. Luminor has a deposit market share of 16% and lending market share of 22%.

Luminor was founded in August 2017 on the basis of the Baltic operations of Nordea and DNB. Luminor took over 930,000 of DNB's former customers and 350,000 of Nordea former customers. The merger was completed on 1 January 2019.

Originally, Nordea owned 56.5% and DNB owned 43.5% of Luminor. In September 2018, it was announced that 60% of Luminor's shares will be sold to the Blackstone Group led consortium. The transaction was approved by the European Commission in January 2019. The transaction was completed in September 2019. After the transaction, Nordea and DNB own of 20% stakes both. Blackstone and Nordea have agreed that Blackstone would also purchase Nordea's remaining 20% in Luminor. Blackstone is planning to remain the shareholder for four to seven years after which it most likely will exit by listing Luminor on several stock exchanges.

The CEO of Luminor is Peter Bosek and the chairman of the supervisory board is Nils Melngailis. Kerli Gabrilovica is head of the Latvian branch and Andrius Načajus is head of the Lithuanian branch. , Luminor had 3,000 employees. In February 2019, the bank announced that, due to consolidation, it would reduce its staff by 130 employees in Estonia, 250 employees in Latvia, and 420 employees in Lithuania. 
Luminor has over €15 billion of assets.

References

External links
 Official Estonian website
 Official Lithuanian website
 Official Latvian website
 Bank Profile: Luminor Bank

Banks of Estonia
Banks of Latvia
Banks of Lithuania
Banks established in 2017
Estonian companies established in 2017
2019 mergers and acquisitions
Banks under direct supervision of the European Central Bank